Chromosome 21 open reading frame 91 is a protein that in humans is encoded by the C21orf91 gene.

EURL is a structural protein gene that is encoded within the human chromosome 21. It stands for gene Expressed in Undifferentiated Retina and Lens and was first found in chick embryos. It is also known as C21orf 91 (Chromosome 21 open reading frame 91). This gene produces many molecules; among them is a protein that influences neural development. This protein-coding region helps to code for neural development in humans and is strongly associated with neural progenitor cells as well as neurons associated with the cerebral cortex of the brain.

Thus, being on chromosome 21, defects linked to this gene are heavily correlated to Down Syndrome. There are some knockout models regarding other genes involved in Down Syndrome, but there seems to be primary interest in a knockdown model for this specific gene. It is believed that because there is three codes of this gene rather than two, that the higher concentration of this molecule has the implications leading to Down Syndrome. Scientists are currently working on a hypothesis that the dosage of the EURL protein is directly correlated to neural development in the embryo and how an altered dosage leads to the neural deficits seen in Down Syndrome.

References

Further reading

External links 
 

Genes